The 2009 Humboldt State Lumberjacks football team represented Humboldt State University during the 2009 NCAA Division II football season. The Great Northwest Athletic Conference (GNAC) resumed sponsoring football as of the 2009 season, so Humboldt State no longer competed as an independent.

The 2009 Lumberjacks were led by second-year head coach Rob Smith. They played home games at the Redwood Bowl in Arcata, California. Humboldt State finished the season with a record of five wins and five losses (5–5, 1–5 GNAC). Each team played the other conference teams twice during the season (home and away). The Lumberjacks outscored their opponents 276–220 for the 2009 season.

Schedule

References

Humboldt State
Humboldt State Lumberjacks football seasons
Humboldt State Lumberjacks football